The 2022 L'Open 35 de Saint-Malo was a professional
tennis tournament played on outdoor clay courts. It was the twenty-seventh edition of the tournament and a part of the
2022 WTA 125 tournaments. It took place in Saint-Malo,
France between 2 and 8 May 2022.

Singles main-draw entrants

Seeds

 1 Rankings are as of 25 April 2022.

Other entrants
The following players received wildcards into the singles main draw:
  Tessah Andrianjafitrimo
  Elsa Jacquemot
  Léolia Jeanjean
  Monica Puig

The following players received entry from the qualifying draw:
  Estelle Cascino
  Jaimee Fourlis
  Eri Hozumi
  Laura Pigossi

Withdrawals 
Before the tournament
  Anna Bondár → replaced by  Tamara Korpatsch
  Lucia Bronzetti → replaced by  Océane Dodin
  Caroline Garcia → replaced by  Mai Hontama
  Varvara Gracheva → replaced by  Fiona Ferro
  Kaja Juvan → replaced by  Heather Watson
  Kaia Kanepi → replaced by  Rebecca Marino
  Marta Kostyuk → replaced by  Kamilla Rakhimova
  Greet Minnen → replaced by  Maddison Inglis
  Alison Van Uytvanck → replaced by  Bernarda Pera
  Zheng Qinwen → replaced by  Diane Parry

Doubles main-draw entrants

Seeds 

 1 Rankings as of April 25, 2022.

Champions

Singles

  Beatriz Haddad Maia def.  Anna Blinkova 7–6(7–3), 6–3

Doubles

  Eri Hozumi /  Makoto Ninomiya def.  Estelle Cascino /  Jessika Ponchet 7–6(7–1), 6–1

References

External links
 Official website

2022 WTA 125 tournaments
2022 in French tennis
May 2022 sports events in France
2022 L'Open 35 de Saint-Malo